Glenn Earl (born June 10, 1981 in Southfield, Michigan) is a former American football safety in the National Football League. He was drafted by the Houston Texans in the fourth round of the 2004 NFL Draft. He grew up in Lisle, Illinois and attended Naperville North High School. He then played college football at Notre Dame.

College career
He began his career at the University of Notre Dame as a wide receiver before switching to safety after his redshirt freshman season.  He played in 38 games for the Irish with 24 starts and amassed 169 career tackles, three forced fumbles, five fumble recoveries, four INTs, four sacks and 3 blocked kicks.

Earl earned a reputation as a hard hitter in the Irish secondary.  He was one of the better enforcers Notre Dame had in recent years, even being labeled as "The Quiet Assassin" by teammates.

Professional career

Houston Texans
Earl was drafted by the Houston Texans in the fourth round of the 2004 NFL Draft. He made 31 starts through his first three seasons and had a career-high 74 tackles in 2006. Earl was knocked out with a torn Lisfranc ligament in his foot during the 2007 preseason in a game at Reliant Stadium. After four years in Houston, Earl was released on August 29, 2008.

Chicago Bears
After two seasons away from the NFL recovering from his foot injury, Earl agreed to terms on a one-year contract with the Chicago Bears on March 20, 2009.

On July 28, 2009, Glenn Earl retired. "He's decided to hang it up," Craig Domann said. "He's been dealing with some injuries since he came out of Notre Dame. I think he felt like it was time to move on."

References

External links
Houston Texans bio
Notre Dame Fighting Irish bio

1981 births
Living people
American football safeties
Chicago Bears players
Houston Texans players
Notre Dame Fighting Irish football players
People from DuPage County, Illinois
Sportspeople from Southfield, Michigan